Constant Lestienne was the defending champion but retired in the first round against Simone Bolelli.

Stefano Travaglia won the title after defeating Marco Cecchinato 6–2, 3–6, 6–4 in the final.

Seeds

Draw

Finals

Top half

Bottom half

References
Main Draw
Qualifying Draw

Prosperita Open - Singles
2017 Singles